William George Bowman (January 23, 1867 in Chicago – December 28, 1944 in Chicago) was a catcher in Major League Baseball for the Chicago Colts (today known as the Chicago Cubs) in 1891. Bowman appeared in 15 games for the Colts, batting just .089 (4-for-45) with one double and five RBI. He died on April 6, 1944, in Arlington Heights, Illinois.

References
Baseball-reference page

1869 births
1918 deaths
Chicago Colts players
Major League Baseball catchers
Burials at Rosehill Cemetery
19th-century baseball players
Rockford (minor league baseball) players
Wheeling National Citys players
Wheeling Nailers (baseball) players
Sacramento Senators players
Rochester Hop Bitters players
Buffalo Bisons (minor league) players
Cedar Rapids (minor league baseball) players
New Orleans Pelicans (baseball) players
Mobile Blackbirds players
Worcester Farmers players
Baseball players from Chicago